"Trevor" is the seventeenth episode of the sixth season of the science fiction television series The X-Files. It premiered on the Fox network on April 11, 1999 in the United States. The episode was written by Jim Guttridge and Ken Hawryliw, and directed by Rob Bowman. "Trevor" is a "Monster-of-the-Week" episode, unconnected to the series' wider mythology. "Trevor" earned a Nielsen household rating of 10.4, being watched by 17.6 million people in its initial broadcast. The episode received mixed reviews from critics.

The X-Files centers on a pair of FBI Special Agents Fox Mulder (David Duchovny) and Dana Scully (Gillian Anderson) who work on cases usually, but not exclusively, linked to the paranormal, called X-Files. Agent Mulder is a believer in the paranormal, while the skeptical Agent Scully has been assigned by the FBI to debunk his work. However, the two have developed a close friendship. In "Trevor", Agents Mulder and Scully search for an escaped convict in Mississippi who was suspected of killing his prison warden under mysterious circumstances. They then set out to find and apprehend him, but in doing so, Agents Mulder and Scully quickly discover that he has the uncanny ability to pass through solid, conductive materials.

"Trevor" was co-written by Ken Hawryliw and Jim Guttridge, who developed a partnership after working on the television series Millennium. The episode was originally supposed to be set in Oklahoma, but was changed to Mississippi for budgetary reasons. In addition, many of the special effects used in the episode were created by conventional methods in order to not exceed the budget of the show; this included the removal of a scene that would have shown Pinker moving through the walls in a motel.

Plot
In Stringer, Mississippi, inmates are being made to prepare and fortify a prison farm for a series of devastating tornadoes, which are due to pass through within the next few hours. An argument breaks out between Wilson "Pinker" Rawls (John Diehl) and another inmate, causing Pinker to nail the other prisoner's hand to a wall. After being reported to the warden for the incident, Pinker is made to sit through the tornado in a tiny outdoor shack. Afterwards, the prisoners and guards emerge from their shelters and discover that the shack has been totally destroyed. One of the guards later finds the warden's body split in half around the waist, propping his office door shut from the inside.

Agents Fox Mulder (David Duchovny) and Dana Scully (Gillian Anderson) soon arrive to investigate. Scully performs an autopsy and concludes that the severing of the torso and severe burn marks could have been caused by the weather conditions at the time and that a substantial amount of the torso is missing from the severing. The guard who found the warden's body insists that it was the work of Pinker, but cannot bring himself to explain how he did it. Mulder finds that a wall in the office has become extremely brittle and crumbles at the slightest touch. Meanwhile, in Meridian, a woman named June Gurwitch is disturbed when she watches a news report on Pinker's apparent death.

Elsewhere, Pinker is revealed to be alive. After breaking into a store to get clothes, he is confronted by a security guard and handcuffed to a pole. However, Pinker slips out of the handcuffs and escapes in the security guard's car. When the agents arrive on the scene, Mulder inspects the handcuffs and finds that they too have become brittle and easily snap in half. Bo Merkle, an old friend of Pinker's, discovers Pinker ransacking his house, demanding to know June's whereabouts. Bo attempts to shoot Pinker, but the bullets pass through him. In response, Pinker burns off Bo's face, killing him. Mulder later discovers that the spent bullets, too, crumble into dust when compressed. He muses that Pinker, after being struck by lightning, must have developed the ability to pass through solid objects. Scully argues that he cannot possibly defy the laws of chemistry.

Evidence leads the agents to track down June, while Pinker accosts her sister Jackie and her son Trevor. Mulder and Scully later discover Jackie, who tells the agents that Pinker has the ability to walk through walls. June has changed her last name to avoid Pinker; the agents find her living with her new boyfriend and convince her to go into witness protection. Pinker, who was hiding in the trunk of the agents' car, leaves a charred message on June's house wall reading "I want what's mine", but the agents discover when this writing stops at the glass of a mirror that glass, acting as an insulator to electricity, repulses Pinker's abilities. Scully finds medical bills indicating that June gave birth to a child and learns that Pinker is actually in search of his son, whom he has not yet met.

June is placed in a motel by the Mississippi Highway Patrol, but Pinker kidnaps her after killing the trooper assigned to guard her. Pinker discovers his child is actually Trevor, who has been living with Jackie for the past several years as her son. Pinker attempts to kidnap Trevor, but is confronted by Mulder, armed with a shotgun. Pinker manages to evade Mulder and continues to chase after Trevor and Scully, whom he quickly corners. Scully, using Mulder's glass insulator hypothesis, locks herself inside a telephone booth with Trevor. After failing to break into the telephone booth, Pinker sees his son trembling in fear. Realizing that he does not want to scare his son anymore, Pinker decides to walk away. However, June appears and hits Pinker with her car; he passes through the metal components of the car, but not its glass windshield, and is cut in half and killed as a result. June insists she had to do it or else Pinker would have hurt Trevor. She asks what Pinker wanted, to which Mulder replies, "Maybe another chance", causing June to cry.

Production

Writing

"Trevor" was co-written by Ken Hawryliw and Jim Guttridge. Hawryliw had been The X-Files property master while the show was filmed in Vancouver, British Columbia (199398). Over the years, he had written several scripts in his spare time but had never submitted them to The X-Files writing staff. Eventually, he secured a job on Millennium, where he developed a friendship with Guttridge. Guttridge showed Hawryliw a script he had been writing that he wanted to submit for The X-Files. Hawryliw enjoyed the premise but felt it was not written in the X-Files style. Hawryliw thus proposed that the two form a partnership: Guttridge would develop the basic story and script and Hawryliw would help transform the story into an acceptable X-Files script. Hawryliw later explained that the idea to make Pinker search out his son came from a desire to humanize the antagonist: "There's this unique man who can walk through walls. Now, who would this ability best apply to? Well, a convict obviously—a guy in prison. But then we had to give him an even stronger, more compelling reason to want his freedom, and that was where his son came from".

After the episode was submitted, several re-writes were requested. Originally, the story was supposed to take place in a "conventional" state prison located in Oklahoma, but because securing such a set would cause the episode to go over budget, the writers decided to set the story on a Mississippi prison farm instead. Another scene, originally scripted to take place at a motel, featured Pinker taking a short cut through a wall. This scene was cut not only because it proved too expensive, but also because the writers were hoping "to shift the episode's emphasis from the supernatural to the emotional."

Casting and filming
When it came time to cast the part of Pinker, casting director Rick Millikan auditioned dozens of actors before reaching out to noted actor John Diehl, famous for his work in the television series Miami Vice, as well as the films Stargate (1994) and Nixon. Millikan explained that, "[Diehl] had been on my list to put into the show since Day One. [...] It turned out the producers like him too—he'd read for us a couple of times already—and we were able to get him in without even a reading".

Director Rob Bowman used a combination of "clever camera angles, strategic use of breakaway cement, and—in the case of Mulder's trunk lid—the miracle of auto-body repair substance Bondo" to avoid going over-budget. Bowman was most proud of the scene where Mulder nudges a wall, only to have it crumble in the shape of a man. He explained that, "the first time we did it, all we got was a big square hole [...] but we didn't want it to look like Bugs Bunny with his ears sticking out, either". Eventually, the crew was able to create a breakaway section that "suggested, rather than outlined perfectly", the shape of a human body. To subtly imply the direction through which Pinker traveled, hair department head Dena Green was instructed to backcomb Diehl's hair for any scene taking place after he had walked through a solid.

Reception
"Trevor" first aired in the United States on April 11, 1999. This episode earned a Nielsen rating of 10.4, with a 16 share, meaning that roughly 10.4 percent of all television-equipped households, and 16 percent of households watching television, were tuned in to the episode. It was viewed by 17.6 million viewers. The episode aired in the United Kingdom and Ireland on Sky1 on June 27, 1999 and received 0.73 million viewers. The episode was the third most watched episode that week, being beaten by The X-Files episode "Milagro". Fox promoted the episode with the tagline "The walls are alive! How can Mulder and Scully chase a killer who can pass through anything?"

Critical reception to the episode was mostly negative. Robert Shearman and Lars Pearson, in their book Wanting to Believe: A Critical Guide to The X-Files, Millennium & The Lone Gunmen, rated the episode two stars out of five, calling it "The X-Files at its most generic". The two noted that the episode had only one good visual gimmick; the ability for Pinker to walk through walls, which, they argue, was never exploited to its full extent. Ultimately, the two concluded that, "'Trevor' is just a bit too disposable and routine to hold much interest". Emily VanDerWerff of The A.V. Club awarded the episode a "C" and wrote that the story "almost works", but that it "focuses too much on the 'monster' and not enough on Mulder and Scully." She called the finished product "something that has a very manufactured quality to it". Furthermore, she criticized that the title of the episode - given that half-way through the episode no one called Trevor has turned up and the antagonist is not motivated by money - suggests the idea that he "must have a son", who then however only gets 10 minutes of screentime. The review also criticizes that the episode tries "a reversal and make Pinker an object of the audience's sympathy, rather than the story's villain". VanDerWerff did, however, positively compliment the death sequences as well as the corpses, calling the latter "nicely gruesome". In a comparative list between Fringe episodes and The X-Files episodes, UGO Networks writer Alex Zalben named "Trevor" as the least effective "walking through walls" story, being beaten by the Fringe episode "Safe".

Not all reviews were negative. Paula Vitaris from Cinefantastique gave the episode a moderately positive review and awarded it two-and-a-half stars out of four. Vitaris, despite criticizing the shaky science behind the tornado with the ability to allow someone to pass through matter, called the episode's special effects "superb": she later cited the "fake corpses" as the best examples. Tom Kessenich, in his book Examination: An Unauthorized Look at Seasons 6–9 of the X-Files wrote positively of the episode, writing, "With 'Trevor' [the show] offered solid proof to those who thought otherwise that The X-Files can still deliver a powerful [Monster-of-the-Week]  when the mood strikes."

Footnotes

Bibliography

External links

 

1999 American television episodes
Television episodes set in Mississippi
The X-Files (season 6) episodes